Princess or Prinzess Irene may refer to:

 Irene Angelina (fl. late 1100s)

 Princess Irene of Hesse and by Rhine (1866 – 1953), daughter of Princess Alice of the United Kingdom and Ludwig IV, Grand Duke of Hesse and by Rhine
 Princess Irene, Duchess of Aosta (1904 – 1974), daughter of Constantine I of Greece and his wife, the former Princess Sophie of Prussia
 Irene Galitzine (1916 - 2006), daughter of Prince Boris of Galitzine and Nina Petrovna Kovaldji
 Princess Irene of the Netherlands (born 1939), daughter of Queen Juliana and Prince Bernhard of the Netherlands
 Princess Irene of Greece and Denmark (born 1942), daughter of King Paul of Greece and Frederika of Hanover

Fiction
The titular character in The Princess and the Goblin

Ships
, a number of steamships with this name

Irene